Holyoke was an American automobile company started in Holyoke, Massachusetts in 1899. The first car had a two-cylinder, 7 hp motor. The cars were designed by Charles Robert Greuter, born Philadelphia, PA, March 26, 1861, and educated St. Gallen and Winterthur, Switzerland. In 1900 the Springfield Republican reported: "The president of the Holyoke motor works is Charles R. Greuter, who started the business of making gasoline carriages and wagons about a year ago in the old Standard machine company building, and at present employs about 40 men."  In 1903 the company was acquired by the Matheson Motor Car company. Greuter then served as a director of that company.

See also 

 Matheson (automobile)

References 

Defunct motor vehicle manufacturers of the United States
1890s cars
American companies established in 1899
Vehicle manufacturing companies established in 1899
Vehicle manufacturing companies disestablished in 1903
1899 establishments in Massachusetts
1903 disestablishments in Massachusetts
Defunct manufacturing companies based in Massachusetts

Highwheeler
1900s cars
Veteran vehicles
Brass Era vehicles